Sokule may refer to the following places:
Sokule, Biała Podlaska County in Lublin Voivodeship (east Poland)
Sokule, Radzyń Podlaski County in Lublin Voivodeship (east Poland)
Sokule, Masovian Voivodeship (east-central Poland)